Leicester Belgrave Road was the Great Northern Railway terminus in Leicester, England. It was the terminus of the GNR's branch line from the Great Northern and London and North Western Joint Railway at Marefield Junction.

Overview
The station opened on 1 January 1883. Marefield Junction was triangular and allowed through running north or south.

Services
The main services from Leicester were to Peterborough and Grantham. The station was also well provided in summer with specials, especially to Skegness and Mablethorpe.

The Peterborough trains were stopped as a war economy in 1916. Local traffic was never heavy, and by 1950 there were only two Grantham trains remaining, one of which was a semi-fast with limited stops which connected with the Flying Scotsman at Grantham. This train was withdrawn in 1951, the remaining stopping train survived until the end of regular services over the joint line in 1953.

Summer specials continued to run until 1962, in the later years with severe speed restrictions on the Leicester branch.

Closure  
The line closed in 1962 but various depots continued in use for a few years using a reinstated connection with the Midland Railway which had last been used for materials delivery during construction. The last of these, Catherine Street oil depot, closed on 1 January 1969.

The Leicester station site has been since been developed as a supermarket and adjoining car park.

Summary of Former Services

Sample Train Timetable for April 1910
The table below shows the train departures from Leicester Belgrave Road in April 1910.

References

External links
GNR spur to Leicester Belgrave Road

Disused railway stations in Leicestershire
Former Great Northern Railway stations
Railway stations in Great Britain opened in 1883
Railway stations in Great Britain closed in 1953